This is a list of Kosovo women's international footballers who have played for the Kosovo women's national football team.

Players

See also 
 Kosovo women's national football team

References 

 
International footballers
International footballers
Kosovo
Football in Kosovo
Association football player non-biographical articles